Freddy Asiel Álvarez Saez (born April 29, 1989) is a Cuban baseball pitcher for the Naranjas de Villa Clara in the Cuban National Series.

In international play, Álvarez played for the Cuban national baseball team in the 2005 World Youth Baseball Championship, 2006 World Junior Baseball Championship, 2009 World Port Tournament, 2013 World Baseball Classic and the 2017 World Baseball Classic.

References

External links

1989 births
Living people
People from Corralillo
Cuban baseball players
Baseball pitchers
2013 World Baseball Classic players
2017 World Baseball Classic players
Naranjas de Villa Clara players
Vequeros de Pinar del Rio players
Cocodrilos de Matanzas players
Pan American Games medalists in baseball
Pan American Games bronze medalists for Cuba
Baseball players at the 2015 Pan American Games
Baseball players at the 2019 Pan American Games
Medalists at the 2015 Pan American Games